The Namibia FA Cup (Namibia Football Association Cup), officially Bidvest Namibia Cup, is an association football tournament for Namibian clubs.

Previous Champions
1990: Black Africa F.C. (Windhoek)
1991: Chief Santos (Tsumeb)
1992: Liverpool (Okahandja)       
1993: Black Africa F.C. (Windhoek)     
1994: Blue Waters (Walvis Bay)
1995: Tigers (Windhoek)
1996: Tigers (Windhoek)
1997: not contested
1998: Chief Santos (Tsumeb)
1999: Chief Santos (Tsumeb)
2000: Chief Santos (Tsumeb)
2001: not contested 
2002: Orlando Pirates (Windhoek) 
2003: FC Civics (Windhoek)
2004: Black Africa F.C. (Windhoek)
2005: Ramblers (Windhoek)    
2006: Orlando Pirates (Windhoek)
2007: African Stars (Windhoek)  
2008: FC Civics (Windhoek)
2009: Orlando Pirates (Windhoek)
2010: African Stars (Windhoek)
2011: Eleven Arrows F.C. (Walvis Bay)
2012: not held
2013: African Stars (Windhoek)
2014: African Stars (Windhoek)
2015: Tigers (Windhoek)
2016: not held
2017: Young African F.C.
2018: African Stars (Windhoek)
2019: not held
2020: not held
2021:

Most titles
 5 African Stars
 4 Chief Santos
 3 Tigers, Orlando Pirates, Black Africa F.C.
 2 FC Civics
 1 Blue Waters, Liverpool, Ramblers, Eleven Arrows F.C., Young African F.C.

See also
Namibia Premier League

References

External links
RSSSF competition history

Football competitions in Namibia
Namibia